James Flood Walker (1868-February 24, 1924) was an architect in the United States who worked in Los Angeles, Seattle, Boise, and San Antonio. Some of Walker's work is listed on the National Register of Historic Places, including the Dr. Frank R. Burroughs House and the St. Anthony Hotel. Other buildings designed by Walker are part of National Register historic districts, including the West End Theatre and the Lawrence Building listed in the Downtown Santa Ana Historic Districts. And Walker designed the John T. Morrison House, listed in the State Street Historic District in Boise.

Career
Walker began his career in Los Angeles, working for Robert Brown Young. Later he located in Seattle and formed a partnership with Edward C. McManus. While in Boise, Walker designed the Idaho Building for the 1904 Louisiana Purchase Exposition in St. Louis. After the Exposition, Walker moved to San Antonio, and he later returned to California.

Death
Walker died in Santa Barbara in 1924.

Oro Vista Mining and Milling Company
In 1896 Walker became a director and minor shareholder in the Oro Vista Mining and Milling Co. of California. By 1905, the company charter had been forfeited for nonpayment of business taxes.

If an association existed between James Flood Walker and Comstock Lode miner James Clair Flood, it has not been established.

Works

Ritzville, Washington
 Dr. Frank R. Burroughs House (1890)

Seattle
 M.F. Backus Apartment Building (1901)
 M.S. Boothe House (1902)
 Cyrus F. Clapp Building (1902)
 H.E. Daniels House (1902)
 George W. Dilling House (1902)
 Carrie B. Friend Apartment Building (1902)
 W.K. Green Houses (1902)
 Rosa Lobe Apartment Building (1901)
 W.D. Perkins House (1902)

St. Louis, Missouri
 Idaho Building (1904)

St. Anthony, Idaho
 Juvenile Correctional Center (1904)

Twin Falls
 Hotel Perrine (1905)

Boise
 John T. Morrison House (1905)
 "State Street House" 2124 W. State St. (Boise,Idaho)  (Home of Benjamin Anders & John Parsons (1924)

San Antonio, Texas
 St. Anthony Hotel (1909)

Pasadena, California
 Mission Court

Santa Ana
 West End Theatre (1915)
 Lawrence Building (1915)

References

External links
 
 Death of Santa Barbara Architect, The Architect and Engineer (March 1924), pp 109

Architects from California
Architects from Washington (state)
Architects from Idaho
Architects from Texas
1868 births
1924 deaths